Marcel Granollers and Marc López were the defending champions, but lost to Santiago González and Scott Lipsky in the quarterfinals.
Bob Bryan and Mike Bryan won the title, defeating Mahesh Bhupathi and Rohan Bopanna in the final, 6–2, 6–3.

Seeds
All seeds receive a bye into the second round.

Draw

Finals

Top half

Bottom half

References
 Main Draw

Italian Open - Doubles
Men's Doubles